Endenich is a neighborhood in the western part of Bonn, Germany. Before 1904 it was an independent municipality. The village of Endenich was founded in the 8th century, and was first mentioned in 804 as Antiniche. Today, about 12,000 people live in Endenich.

Sights 
The composer and pianist Robert Schumann lived for the last two years of his life in the mental clinic Richarz'sche Heilanstalt  on Magdalenenstraße (on today's Sebastianstraße), where he died on July 29, 1856. The former clinic now houses the Schumannhaus Bonn, a music library and museum.

In the northern part is the Max Planck Institute for Radio Astronomy which was opened in 1972.

The improvisational theatre Springmaus, founded by Bill Mockridge, is located in Endenich. Well-known comedians such as Bernhard Hoëcker, Dirk Bach and Bastian Pastewka have performed at this theatre.

Endenich is one of the most cultural districts of Bonn. There are many good restaurants, a very charming retro cinema, pubs and a event location with concerts and shows nearly every night.

References

External links 
Endenich online
The Robert Schumann House
Max Planck Institute for Radioastronomy
Springmaus Theater
Die "Harmonie"
Rex Programmkino

Urban districts and boroughs of Bonn